Cephaloflexa araucariana is a species of land planarian in the subfamily Geoplaninae found in Brazil.

Description 
The dorsum is bluish-gray with two lateral black bands. The venter is dark gray, becoming black near the margins. The anterior end is narrow and rolled upwards by a retractor muscle.

The numerous eyes are distributed marginally along the whole body, except for the apex of the anterior end, where they are absent.

Distribution 
The only known place of occurrence of C. araucariana is the São Francisco de Paula National Forest in southern Brazil.

References 

Geoplanidae
Invertebrates of Brazil